Virgil Ortiz (born 1969) is a Pueblo artist, known for his pottery and fashion design from Cochiti Pueblo, New Mexico. Ortiz makes a variety of pottery, including traditional Cochiti figurative pottery, experimental figurative pottery, traditional pottery vessels. His clothing and jewelry designs are influenced by traditional Native American pattern and aesthetics. He is best known for his edgy pottery figures, his contemporary take on the traditional Cochiti pottery figures (monos) from the late 1800s.

About 

Virgil Ortiz was born in 1969 at Cochiti Pueblo in New Mexico and was the youngest of six children. He is of the Herrera family of Pueblo potters in New Mexico, whose work is often found in art collections and in art museums. Virgil's mother is noted potter Seferina Ortiz (1931-2007) and grandson of Cochiti potter, Laurencita Herrera (1912–1984). His mother taught him to make traditional Cochiti pueblo pottery. “The thought has never crossed my mind to be anything other than an artist and fashion designer. Art is in my blood,” he said. His three siblings are also potters, Inez Ortiz, Joyce Lewis, and Janice Ortiz.

Virgil won his first Santa Fe Indian Market award at the age of 14. “I grew up participating in Indian Market, it was always an exciting time for my family,” he said. By age 16, Virgil Ortiz was a successful, working artist and he began to travel. “I would have a show, sell pottery and save,” he said in an interview. “With the money saved I would take a friend and we would travel to different cities -- New York, Chicago, Los Angeles -- and I got to experience different cultures.” Virgil was drawn to the night club scene. There he saw many people with tattoos and piercings that reminded him of the 1800s Cochiti figures.

“I was inspired to create images of what I saw, it gave me a freedom knowing that I was not an innovator or even going outside of tradition, I was in fact a Revivalist,” he said.

Honors and awards

Ortiz was selected to be a United States Artists, Target Fellow in 2007, in Crafts and Traditional Arts.

Ortiz received the 2022 Living Treasure Award from the Museum of Indian Arts and Culture.

Collections

Virgil Ortiz's works are in various permanent museum collections, including the National Museum of the American Indian, Stedelijk Museum, Museum of Indian Arts & Culture, Virginia Museum of Fine Arts, Albuquerque Museum, and others.

Work

Traditional Cochiti pottery figures (monos ) 
During the early days of the transcontinental railroad, Cochiti artists caricatured the travelers—circus performers, salesmen, and adventurers— who suddenly appeared in their world. “The figurative style was a form of social commentary,” Ortiz said. “They captured in clay the images of all the crazy, nonnative people who were passing through the area at that time. Those crazier pieces and the tradition of pottery as social commentary really leave the board wide open for me as an artist.” Ortiz and other Cochiti potters have revived this tradition for the 21st century.

Around 1984, Bob Gallegos, an Albuquerque collector, showed the young Ortiz his collection of 1800s Cochiti pottery. Ortiz couldn't believe how similar the 19th-century pottery was to his own work. He had never seen these pieces before.

Fashion 
For a 2003 collaboration with designer Donna Karan, he developed boldly patterned textiles based on his graphic decorative painting. Three years later he established Indigene, his own fashion line. In 2017, Ortiz collaborated with Smithsonian National Museum of the American Indian in designing jewelry pieces inspired by Cochiti art forms.

Exhibitions 



See also
List of Native American artists
Lisa Holt and Harlan Reano, Holt is Ortiz's niece and a Native American potter.

References

External links
Virgil Ortiz, official website
Video: "Here My Voice" Artist Profile of Virgil Ortiz (2017) by Virginia Museum of Fine Arts
Video: Virgil Ortiz's ReVOlution (2018) large scale video projections made in collaboration with Ideum for the 2018 – 2019 exhibition Revolution – Rise Against the Invasion at Colorado Springs Fine Art Center at Colorado College

1969 births
Pueblo artists
Living people
Native American potters
Artists from New Mexico
Native American designers
Indigenous fashion designers of the Americas
People from Sandoval County, New Mexico
20th-century ceramists
20th-century American artists
21st-century ceramists
21st-century American artists
20th-century Native Americans
21st-century Native Americans